The Video Link is a live concert video album by German heavy metal band Rage, released on VHS in January 1994 and on DVD in February 2003. The video contains shows that the band played in the Docks in Hamburg on 25 September 1993 as well as documentaries and "Behind the Scenes" during the songs.

VHS track listing

DVD track listing

Personnel

Band members 
Peter "Peavy" Wagner – vocals, bass, arrangements
Manni Schmidt – guitars
Chris Ephthimiadis – drums

Production 
Sven Conquest – producer, engineer, mixing
Peter Ernst – mastering
Karl-Ulrich Walterbach – executive producer

Rage (German band) albums
1994 video albums
1994 live albums
Noise Records live albums
Speed metal video albums